An ongoing refugee crisis began in Europe in late February 2022 after Russia's invasion of Ukraine. Over 8.1 million refugees fleeing Ukraine have been recorded across Europe, while an estimated 8 million others had been displaced within the country by late May 2022. Approximately one-quarter of the country's total population had left their homes in Ukraine by 20 March. 90% of Ukrainian refugees are women and children, while most Ukrainian men age 18 to 60 are banned from leaving the country. By 24 March, more than half of all children in Ukraine had left their homes, of whom a quarter had left the country. The invasion caused Europe's largest refugee crisis since World War II and its aftermath, is the first of its kind in Europe since the Yugoslav Wars in the 1990s, as well as the fourth largest refugee crisis in history, and is the largest refugee crisis of the 21st century, with the highest refugee flight rate globally.

The vast majority of refugees initially entered neighbouring countries to the west of Ukraine (Poland, Slovakia, Hungary, Romania, and Moldova). Around 3 million people then moved further west to other European countries. As of 18 October 2022, according to UNHCR data, the countries receiving the largest numbers of Ukrainians were Russia (2.77 million), Poland (1.5 million), Germany (1 million) and the Czech Republic (0.4 million), with the latter now hosting the largest number of Ukrainian refugees per capita. As of September 2022, Human Rights Watch documented that Ukrainian civilians were being forcibly transferred to Russia. The UN Human Rights Office stated "There have been credible allegations of forced transfers of unaccompanied children to Russian occupied territory, or to the Russian Federation itself." The United States Department of State estimated that at least 900,000 Ukrainian citizens have been forcibly relocated to Russia. More than 4.5 million Ukrainians have returned to Ukraine since the beginning of the invasion.

European Union (EU) countries bordering Ukraine have allowed entry to all Ukrainian refugees, and the EU has invoked the Temporary Protection Directive which grants Ukrainians the right to stay, work, and study in any European Union member state for an initial period of one year. Some non-European and Romani people have reported ethnic discrimination at the border.

Refugees before the 2022 invasion 

Before the invasion, the annexation of Crimea by the Russian Federation and the war in the Donbas, both of which are aspects of the Russo-Ukrainian War, had already resulted in over two million refugees and internally displaced persons since 2014. They have been referred to as Europe's forgotten refugees by some media, due to their cool reception in the European Union, comparatively low asylum claim success rate and media neglect.

More than a million of the pre-2022 refugees, mainly from Donbas, had gone to Russia between 2014 and 2016, while the number of people displaced within Ukraine had grown to 1.6 million people by early March 2016.

Journey

Transportation 

For many refugees heading westward, trains played a vital role in the journey within Ukraine and into neighboring countries. Oleksandr Kamyshin, the CEO of Ukrainian Railways, which operates the majority of train services in Ukraine, estimated that within three weeks of the start of the invasion, the network had transported 2.5 million passengers. He also said at its peak, the network transported 190,000 people a day.

To ensure trains can travel as safely as possible, the network had to constantly adapt to situations on the ground, such as if tracks are damaged by bombs or if they are no longer under Ukrainian control. Trains have to move slower because they are often overloaded to fit as many people as possible, as well as minimising the risk of hitting damaged tracks. At night, trains also turn off their lights to reduce the chance of being targeted.

Railway companies in several European countries, including Austria, Belgium, the Czech Republic, Denmark, Finland, France, Germany, Hungary, Lithuania, the Netherlands, Poland, Romania, Slovakia and Switzerland, allowed Ukrainian refugees to travel by train for free.

Other refugees traveled by motor vehicles or on foot. In some border crossings, traffic jams of several kilometres long formed. Air travel was not available in Ukraine as the country closed its airspace to civilian flights on the day of the invasion.

Staging grounds and border crossings
The city of Lviv in the west of Ukraine became a key staging ground for refugees. Up to 100,000 refugees were arriving in the city every day, which prior to the invasion had a population of 700,000. From Lviv, trains transport refugees to border crossing points such as Medyka, Poland and Uzhhorod, close to the border with Slovakia and Hungary. From Medyka, most refugees continue to Przemyśl, Poland, and onward to the rest of Europe.

Other major border crossings included Siret, Romania; Ocnița and Palanca, Moldova; Beregsurány, Hungary and Vyšné Nemecké, Slovakia.

Number of refugees

- Note: Refugee numbers for Russia  are based on border crossings into Russia up to March 2022. Figures for other countries are refugees registered for protection in each country or, if this figure is not available, refugees registered as living in that country.

Numbers of refugees can change quickly and are often only estimates. Movements from country to country are not necessarily registered officially. Ukrainians are allowed to travel to some countries in Europe without a visa and may be allowed to stay in the country for a longer period, without special permission. Elsewhere, they have to apply for asylum. Due to the Schengen arrangements, having entered any Schengen country, refugees can travel on to other Schengen countries without any visas or border checks.

The United Nations Office for the Coordination of Humanitarian Affairs estimated on 27 February that in two months there would be 7.5 million internally displaced people in Ukraine, 12 million people would be in need of healthcare and the number of people fleeing the war could reach 4 million. The United Nations High Commissioner for Refugees (UNHCR) stated that the situation was Europe's fastest growing refugee crisis since the Second World War. By early November, according to the UNHCR, the number of Ukrainian refugees recorded across Europe was around 7.8 million. The countries receiving the largest numbers of refugees were Russia (2.9 million), Poland (1.5 million), Germany (1 million) and the Czech Republic (0.4 million).

The communications chief of the UN High Commission for Human Rights called the speed of the exodus of refugees from Ukraine "phenomenal".

A study by the UN agency International Organization for Migration released on 21 March found that 13.5% of displaced people had also been displaced in 2014–2015. The study found that 60% of refugee households were traveling with children, and of the nearly 10 million people displaced within and outside Ukraine on that date, 186,000 were nationals of a third country.

Countries

Neighbouring countries 
Neighbouring countries are listed in order of the number of refugees who have entered them; others are listed alphabetically.

Poland 

As early as 15 February, Poland was expecting a possible Russian attack on Ukraine. The Polish government asked communities to prepare for up to a million refugees. By 25 July, more than 1.2 million Ukrainian refugees had been recorded in Poland. Poland greatly reduced the usual border formalities and said that various identity documents would be accepted.

Assembly points for refugees have opened in every district of Poland. Local authorities are providing free accommodation, food, and other necessary supplies. Apart from that, a huge number of citizens and organisations are voluntarily offering assistance, free accommodation and other help. Websites with information for refugees are also in Ukrainian. The government is preparing legal changes that would simplify the employment of Ukrainians in Poland, since currently a working visa is required as Ukrainians are from outside of the EU.

President of the European Council Charles Michel visited the Polish-Ukrainian border crossing on 2 March and praised Polish efforts "to guarantee safe passages for Ukrainians, for European citizens" and those from other countries "without any discrimination." In a later interview for France Inter he denounced alleged claims of racism of Ukrainian and Polish serviceman as "Russian propaganda" and part of Russia's information warfare. (See also .) Many observers believe that most are likely to stay in Poland and other Central European countries because "tight labor markets, affordable cities and a pre-existing diaspora have made those countries more appealing alternatives for Ukrainians, who find options slimmer in Europe's west".

The number of refugees arriving to Poland have been unparalleled in Europe. Modelling estimates show that by 1 April, Ukrainian people (including refugees but also those previously living in Poland) made up between 15% and 30% of the population of each of the major Polish cities. For example, Ukrainians accounted for 10% of the total population of Wrocław before the war  and this figure had increased to 23% by April 2022.

Poland has taken in almost 1.5 million Ukrainian refugees. The migration has resulted in a 50% rise in the population of Rzeszów, the largest city in south-eastern Poland. Warsaw's population has increased by 15%, Kraków's by 23%, and Gdansk's by 34%. Ukrainian refugees have the legal right to reside and work across the European Union. They are also entitled to the same benefits as Poles, including health insurance, free public education, and child allowance.

Less than a month after the invasion, the Polish government established the Aid Fund, run by Bank Gospodarstwa Krajowego, which funds all actions and programs aimed at assisting and integrating Ukrainian refugees.  The European Investment Bank has made a €600 million loan to the Aid Fund, after authorizing an initial €2 billion loan in June. The fund is distributed by Bank Gospodarstwa Krajowego (BGK) to local governments and other public bodies that welcome and house Ukrainian migrants.

Romania 
As of 27 May, the Romanian government had reported 989,357 Ukrainians entering Romania. Romanian Defence Minister Vasile Dîncu announced on 22 February that Romania could receive 500,000 refugees if necessary; the first refugees arrived two days later. On 15 March, Minister of Foreign Affairs Bogdan Aurescu reported that about 80,000 remained in the country.

Some ethnic Romanians are among the Ukrainians who have fled to Romania.

Russia 

According to the Ukrainian authorities, Russian troops in the territories of Ukraine occupied by Russia are engaged in the forcible deportation of people from Ukraine to Russia, passing them off as refugees. According to the Russian government figures, 971,417 refugees had gone to Russia by 26 May. In March, the Ukrainian foreign ministry alleged that 2,389 Ukrainian children had been abducted from Russian-occupied territory in Donetsk and Luhansk, and transferred to Russia, as well as "several thousand" residents of Mariupol. Near the end of April it was reported that Ukrainian officials believed the number of Ukrainian children forced from eastern Ukraine and entered into the Russian adoption system totalled around 150,000. It had been previously reported by Russian media on that children without parents in Donetsk were being placed with Russian parents through their adoption network.

Amnesty International reported that "The abusive and humiliating process known as 'filtration' is a shocking violation of international human rights and humanitarian law. Our research shows that many displaced Ukrainians end up inside Russia or Russia-occupied territories involuntarily, even if they are not physically forced to move. Deportation and forcible transfer of civilians in occupied territory are prohibited by international humanitarian law and can constitute war crimes or crimes against humanity."

Hungary 

From the start of the Russian invasion up to 26 July, 1,041,762 refugees from Ukraine had arrived in Hungary. As there are no border checks within the Schengen area, Hungary does not know how many people have moved to other Schengen countries. 500 people from third-party countries arrived by train in Budapest and asked the police for help; these were mostly students or migrant workers from Asia and Africa who had been living in Ukraine.

Moldova 

Moldova was among the first countries to receive refugees from the Odesa and Vinnytsia regions. Moldovan authorities have activated a centre for crisis management to facilitate accommodation and humanitarian relief for refugees. As of 26 July, 549,333 Ukrainian refugees had entered Moldova. Prime Minister of Moldova Natalia Gavrilița said on 5 April that 100,000 refugees are staying in Moldova, with almost half of them being children. On 11 April, the UN said that Moldova was "hosting an estimated 95,000 Ukrainians." According to Médecins Sans Frontières, the majority of refugees who do not stay continue on to Romania, Poland or other European countries.

Moldova received the highest number of refugees per capita of any country despite being one of Europe's poorest countries. According to Middle East Eye, this has led to social tensions, and international aid was deemed crucial to help Moldovan institutions handle the influx of refugees. On 22 March, the Financial Times estimated that 4% of the Moldovan population were currently refugees, and reported that the government of Moldova had requested financial aid to cope with the emergency. At a conference in Berlin on 5 April, Germany and several partners, including France, Romania and the European Union, agreed to provide €659.5 million in aid to Moldova.

Moldova has a critical view of Russia's invasion, due to its own internal conflict with Russian-backed Transnistria. The government of Moldova is providing free bus rides, and Romania has assisted Moldova with moving people onwards into Romania, in order to relieve the pressure in Moldova. On 12 March, Germany agreed to take 2,500 refugees who were in Moldova. On 5 March, Germany announced it will take an additional 12,000 refugees.

Some Ukrainian refugees have also gone to the unrecognized breakaway state of Transnistria. The state-owned newspaper Novosti Pridnestrovya reported on 4 April that a total of around 27,300 Ukrainian citizens had arrived in Transnistria, of whom 21,000 had applied for temporary residence permits.

Slovakia 

As of 8 March, Slovakia had taken in over 140,000 people. By 26 July, 627,555 Ukrainian refugees had entered Slovakia. However, most of the refugees continued further west, mainly to the Czech Republic, the country that now hosts the largest number of Ukrainian refugees per capita of any European country. About 80,000 refugees have settled so far in Slovakia.

Belarus 
According to Belarusian government figures, 30,092 had gone to Belarus by 29 May.

Other European countries

EU legal framework
Ukraine has an Association Agreement with the European Union and since 2017 Ukrainians with biometric passports have had the right to 90 days visa-free stay in the Schengen Area. Following the invasion of Ukraine, the Commission has called upon member states to authorise the entry and stay of those without biometric passports on humanitarian grounds, and member states had done so since the refugees started to arrive across the borders.

On 4 March, the Council of the EU unanimously agreed to implement the Temporary Protection Directive for the first time in its history, so that refugees fleeing from Ukraine do not have to go through the standard European Union asylum procedure. Temporary protection is an emergency mechanism which gives the right to stay in an EU member state for an initial period of one year, which may be extended for up to a maximum of three years. The beneficiaries enjoy harmonised rights across the EU such as residence, access to the labour market and housing, medical assistance, and access to education for children. The Council did not adopt a system of quotas of displaced persons, but left it to the beneficiaries to choose their destination freely.

Austria 
The Austrian Interior Minister Gerhard Karner from the ÖVP and the Federal Chancellor Karl Nehammer announced that Austria was willing to take in refugees from Ukraine. All refugees are allowed to stay in the country for 90 days. Of 150,000 Ukrainian refugees having arrived in Austria, about 7,000 have applied for asylum, with most proceeding to other countries.

Belgium 
On 25 February, Belgian State Secretary for Asylum and Migration Sammy Mahdi called for Europe to coordinate the reception. Two days later, Development Minister Meryame Kitir announced that three million euros would be allocated for additional humanitarian aid to Ukraine. By 17 March, 10,000 refugees had registered for temporary protection in Belgium. By 14 April, 30,807 refugees had been registered in Belgium.

Bulgaria 
Up to 5 March, roughly 25,000 Ukrainian refugees had arrived in Bulgaria. By 12 March, their number was nearly 70,000. By 28 March, about 125,500. By 16 April, 185,055 Ukrainian citizens had entered Bulgaria, 87,439 remained in the country, of whom approximately 25,000 were children. The chairman of the State Agency for Refugees told the Bulgarian National Radio that as of 24 August, 91,903 Ukrainian refugees remained in Bulgaria, with nearly 40% of them being children.

Croatia 
From the start of the Russian invasion to 4 September, 21,676 Ukrainian refugees entered Croatia, of whom over 49.9% were women, over 33.5% children and nearly 16.6% men.

Cyprus 
By 9 March, around 3,000 Ukrainian refugees had entered Cyprus since the day after the Russian invasion, the Cypriot interior ministry reported; 19 of these had sought asylum. By April their number was around 10,000.

Czech Republic 

The Czech Republic is providing financial, humanitarian and other types of aid to Ukrainian refugees as well as state accommodation and education for their children. The Czech Republic had received over 100,000 Ukrainian refugees by 7 March. As of 10 March the Czech Republic had received approximately 200,000 refugees. As the country is close to reaching its maximum housing capacity for refugees, the government is considering the construction of refugee camps. By 17 March, over 270,000 refugees from Ukraine had arrived in the Czech Republic, the number rising to over 300,000 by 23 March, and to 318,785 by 30 April. The country now hosts the largest number of Ukrainian refugees per capita of any European country.

A network of Regional Centres for Help and Assistance to Ukraine (Krajská asistenční centra pomoci Ukrajině) was created in the regional capitals of the country to help refugees obtain registration, accommodation, health insurance or other assistance. On 17 March, a law known as Lex Ukrajina was passed by Parliament to make it easier for refugees to obtain residence permits and access healthcare.

Also on 17 March, some media, including Associated Press and BBC News, incorrectly reported that the Czech Prime Minister had said: "Czech Republic can no longer accept refugees from Ukraine". However, someone had mistranslated his Czech quote: "We are at the very limit of what we are capable of absorbing without any major problems (...) we must continue in the steps that will allow us to cope with more high numbers". The BBC later corrected the mistranslation.

Denmark 

By 25 March, the Danish authorities had registered around 24,000 Ukrainians as having arrived in Denmark, with roughly half being children. Because of the visa-free rules for Ukrainians and the borders being largely open, with only sporadic controls, the exact number is unknown. The authorities have projected that the number may eventually surpass 100,000 if the war is drawn out. Ukrainian citizens, their close relatives and non-Ukrainians that already had refugee status in Ukraine can receive a two-year residence permit (with the possibility of extension) without having to first request asylum. By 1 April, about 30.000 refugees had reached Denmark according to the authorities amid expectations that the number will rise to around 40.000 after Easter.

Estonia 
By 18 March, 25,190 refugees, of whom over a third were children, had arrived in Estonia. Of the total, 6,437 refugees were transiting, leaving 18,753 who planned to stay in Estonia. By 31 March, 25,347 refugees, of whom about 40 percent were children had entered Estonia. The government received 13,289 applications for temporary protection.

By 3 July, 49,016 Ukrainian refugees had entered Estonia.

Finland 
From the start of the Russian invasion up to 30 March, around 15,000 Ukrainian refugees had entered Finland according to the Finnish Immigration Service. The authorities have estimated that up to 100,000 are likely to arrive in the country.

France 
On 10 March, the Interior Ministry reported that 7,251 people had arrived in France from Ukraine, 6,967 of whom were Ukrainian nationals. By 16 March, at least 17,000 Ukrainian refugees had entered France, according to French interior minister Gérald Darmanin. On 24 March, Prime Minister Jean Castex visiting the new reception center for Ukrainian refugees in Nice on Thursday, and said that 30,000 Ukrainian refugees had entered France since 25 February. As of 30 March, about 45,000 Ukrainians, mainly women and children, had arrived in France.

As of 27 April, more than 70,000 refugees were benefiting from the subsidy for asylum seekers (Ada) in France, and by 24 May, more than 85,000 according to the French Office for Immigration and integration. By 29 May this figure was believed to be around 93,000. The number was expected to reach 100,000 during June said prefect Joseph Zimet, As of 4 July, more than 100,000 refugees were benefiting from the subsidy for asylum seekers (Ada) in France.

A portal called "Je m'engage pour l'Ukraine" (I am committed to Ukraine) was launched with state support, aiming to coordinate help from French citizens.

The French portal to help Ukrainian citizens who choose France has changed its name "Pour l'Ukraine" - "For Ukraine" in French.
France is fully in solidarity with the Ukrainians and mobilized to facilitate their reception in France. The "Pour l'Ukraine" portal offers all the useful information to support them in their first days in France. It also allows citizens wishing to mobilize alongside them, to access devices near their homes.

Polls show that 85% of the French public are in favour of helping Ukrainian refugees.

Georgia 
Georgia suffered similar experiences during the Russo-Georgian War and Georgians have thus been generous towards the people of Ukrainian refugees. According to the UN Refugee Agency data, as of January 2023, Georgia officially recorded 25,101 Ukrainian refugees but the full number of unregistered Ukrainians in the country is unknown.

Georgia has also opened facilities in several cities for Ukrainian children so they could learn in their own language. The Georgian government has set up shelters for Ukrainians has sent up to 1,000 tons of humanitarian aid to the country and "shelters up to 28,000 Ukrainians" said Prime Minister Irakli Garibashvili on May 27, 2022. He noted the Government has allocated US$7 million to care for the Ukrainian refugees, and will allot the same amount for aid to Ukraine through 2022.

Germany 

The first refugees from Ukraine arrived in Brandenburg on the evening of 25 February, and the federal state was initially preparing for some 10,000 people. Other states pledged their help. In addition, Mecklenburg-Vorpommern decided to stop the forced return of people to Ukraine.

On 8 March, a legal norm was enacted (Ukraine-Aufenthalts-Übergangsverordnung), which temporarily legalizes the entry and residence of Ukrainians and third-country nationals in Germany who were legally resident in Ukraine at the beginning of the Russian attack on 24 February.

Deutsche Bahn, the German national railway company, allowed refugees with a Ukrainian passport or ID card to travel free of charge on long-distance trains from Poland to Germany. The company also gave out free tickets to refugees who wanted to continue to another destination; by 17 March, more than 100,000 had been issued. The Association of German Transport Companies decided to also cancel charges for all short-distance travel with buses and trains for Ukrainian refugees within Germany.

German media debated whether there was a difference in the portrayal of refugees from Ukraine compared to those from other countries, particularly those arriving during the 2015 European migrant crisis.

According to the Federal Ministry of the Interior and Community, 37,786 war refugees from Ukraine had registered in Germany by midday on 6 March; by March 14 the number had reached almost 147,000. By 23 March, almost 239,000 refugees had entered Germany. The interior ministry said that by 10 March, 300,000 private homes had offered accommodation. Temporary shelters were built in places such as the former Berlin Tegel Airport and Terminal 5 of Berlin Brandenburg Airport.

Greece 
On 1 March, the Greek government was considering evacuating the 100,000 ethnic Greeks from Mariupol and its surrounding area. Many early refugees were from Ukraine's sizeable ethnic Greek community. By 4 April, over 16,700 Ukrainian refugees had arrived in Greece of whom 5,117 were minors according to government officials.

Iceland 
Between 1 January and 25 April, 845 Ukrainians applied for asylum in Iceland. More may have arrived already, who have not yet applied for asylum. As of 13 April, 748 Ukrainians had applied for asylum, of whom 26 percent were under the age of 18.

Ireland 
In early March, the Irish government announced that it expected to receive over 100,000 refugees. However this was later increased to 200,000. 21,000 refugees had arrived by 11 April, of whom about 13,000 were being accommodated in State-provided accommodation.
Government expect 40,000 Ukrainians by the end of April. By mid-November over 58,000 Ukrainians had come to Ireland, equivalent to over 1% of the population of Ireland. November 2022 also saw the beginning of the 2022–2023 Irish anti-immigration protests, which saw pockets of protests against the arrival of refugees.

Italy 
Up to 9 March, 23,872 Ukrainian refugees had arrived in Italy, according to Prime Minister Mario Draghi, mainly arriving via the Italian-Slovenian border. By 12 March, three days later, this number had increased to 34,851. By 7 April, the number was 86,066, and 137,385 by 21 June.

Starting from March 2022, assets seized from the mafia by the Italian government have begun housing Ukrainian refugees.

Latvia 

The Latvian Interior Ministry had prepared a plan in case of a large influx of people from Ukraine as early as 14 February. On 24 February, the government approved a contingency plan to receive and accommodate approximately 10,000 refugees from Ukraine. Several non-governmental organizations, municipalities, schools and other institutions also pledged to provide accommodation. On 27 February, around 20 volunteer professional drivers departed to Lublin with supply donations, bringing Ukrainian refugees on their way back.

The first refugees began arriving on 26 February and by 2 March Latvia had taken in more than 1,000 Ukrainian refugees. By 9 March, humanitarian visas had been issued to 67 Ukrainian citizens. To deal with the increasingly large numbers of refugees, a second Ukrainian refugee help center is scheduled to be opened in the former building of Riga Technical University on 14 March. As of 20 March, 6,253 Ukrainian refugees are registered in Riga. From the start of the Russian invasion up to 23 March, 12,000 Ukrainian refugees had entered Latvia. From the start of the Russian invasion up to 5 June, 31,960 Ukrainian refugees had entered Latvia.

Lithuania 
From the start of the Russian invasion up to 23 May, almost 53,700 Ukrainian refugees had entered Lithuania, including 21,300 children, of whom almost 5,600 were under the age of six as well as 2,500 Ukrainian refugees aged 65 and over.

Luxembourg 
The Ministry of Foreign Affairs of Luxembourg welcomed the European regulations and in early March 2022 set up a "first reception centre" in Luxembourg City. As of April 2022, around 5,000 Refugees were in Luxembourg.

Netherlands 

Prior to the invasion, Ukrainians in search of safety could already fly to the Netherlands and stay for three months. During this time, they had to find their own accommodation as asylum centers were already "overcrowded". State Secretary for Migration Eric van der Burg said that the principle had always been emphasized that refugees should be received in their own region, if possible but that "now Europe is the region." As of 27 February, fewer than 50 refugees had arrived in the Netherlands from Ukraine.

However, by 8 March, 325 Ukrainian refugees had arrived in Rotterdam alone. A local official said that Rotterdam would receive more Ukrainians than the thousand who had been initially expected, "our people are working hard to find places, and they won't stop at a thousand."

The Dutch cabinet wanted to ensure 50,000 places for refugees from Ukraine according to a letter from Justice and Security Minister Yesilgöz, "the safety regions will coordinate the implementation, together with municipalities, of reception locations for at least 1,000 refugees from Ukraine per region within two weeks". Then, in a third phase, the same number would again be admitted.

By 16 March, the municipality of Amsterdam had acquired ships harboured in the Java-eiland to lodge 300 refugees as a way to extend their existing capability.

By late December 2022, 85,210 refugees were registered in the Netherlands.

Norway 
Ukrainian refugees have received free public transport. Ruter, Oslo's public transport authority, has provided free rides since 4 March 2022. Vy, a railway company, provides free train rides to reception centres. Vestland county also provide free public transport.

Portugal 
As of 25 April, Portugal had received 33,106 refugees from Ukraine. The majority of the refugees are Ukrainian citizens, while 5% are non-Ukrainian nationals living in Ukraine at the time of the invasion. There were 22,208 women refugees, 10,898 men and 11,410 minors. As of 6 April, 350 minors had arrived without a parent or legal guardian. In most cases, these minors arrived with close relatives, but 16 of them arrived unaccompanied; this number rose to 45 by 7 April. As of 29 March, 1,800 Portuguese families had offered to provide foster care. The Portuguese authorities expect to find next-of-kin for the majority, and only a tiny number will need permanent adoption.

Before the 2022 invasion, Portugal already had 27,200 Ukrainian immigrants. As a result of the crisis, the Ukrainian immigrant community has become the second-largest in Portugal, almost doubling to over 52,000 in the month of March. That community helped in organizing the transport of refugees.

By 6 April, 2,115 Ukrainian refugee children had been enrolled in Portuguese public schools, up from over 600 on 22 March. Employment wise, as of 6 of April 2022, 359 refugees had been hired, 4,261 registered as looking for work and 2,880 enrolled in Portuguese classes. As of 6 April, Portuguese social security had processed 1,412 requests from Ukrainian refugees. The Portuguese government reiterated that it had set no limit for Ukrainian refugees.

Serbia 
As of 25 July, there are 17,875 Ukrainian refugees in Serbia according to the Office of the United Nations High Commissioner for Human Rights.

Slovenia 
From the start of the Russian invasion up to 23 March, more than 3,000 Ukrainian refugees had entered Slovenia, by 28 March 2022, more than 7,000 Ukrainian refugees had entered Slovenia, and by 15 April, this number had risen to 18,415 though the majority were not remaining in Slovenia.

Spain 
Spain announced that 100,000 Ukrainian citizens already living in the country would be fully legalized. This would allow them to "work legally, so that they can access education, health and social policies" said Prime Minister Pedro Sánchez. Several other authorities from local to central administration stated the willingness to accept more Ukrainian refugees. On March 31, 2022, Prime Minister Sánchez announced that 30,000 Ukrainian refugees had officially be granted the temporary protection status, but expected that number to increase to 70,000 in the next days. Many of the refugees were staying with relatives or friends and had not yet notified the authorities.

The Spanish Ministry of Inclusion, Social Security and Migration enabled reception, attention and relocation centres (CREADE) for Ukrainian refugees in Pozuelo de Alarcón, Barcelona, Alicante and Málaga, resolving around 40,000 applications for temporary protection over the course of the first three weeks of the conflict.

Sweden 
As of 11 March, the authorities had registered 5,200 Ukrainians as having entered Sweden since Russia's invasion. Because of the EU-wide 90 days visa-free rules for Ukrainians and no need for registration at the border, the true number is believed to be considerably higher, probably around 4,000 per day. It has been projected that Sweden most likely will receive around 76,000 refugees from Ukraine in the first half of 2022.

Switzerland 
It was already possible for a Ukrainian citizen (with a biometric passport) to enter Switzerland without a visa, the maximum stay was three months. Justice Minister Karin Keller-Sutter announced on 28 February that in future refugees without passports would be welcome too and residence would no longer be time limited. The federal government and the cantons would provide accommodation for 9,000 refugees. On 11 March, the head of the Justice ministry Karin Keller-Sutter said that 2,100 refugees have already been registered in Switzerland and up to 60,000 refugees could arrive in total. As of 5 April, 24,837 refugees had been registered and 18,149 of them had already received S permits. By October 2022, there were about 70,000 refugees in Switzerland.

United Kingdom 
Britain had issued about 1,000 visas by 13 March and was criticised for placing too many bureaucratic obstacles to entry to the UK for refugees by both international and UK sources, and for only granting admission to refugees who already had family in the UK. On 4 March the United Kingdom announced that British nationals and Ukrainian residents of the UK would be allowed to bring in members of their extended family from Ukraine. Prime Minister Boris Johnson stated that the country could take in 200,000 Ukrainian refugees. On 7 March 2022, French Interior Minister Gerald Darmanin said that many Ukrainian refugees had been turned away by British officials in Calais and told to obtain visas at UK consulates in Paris or Brussels. Emmanuel Macron also criticised the United Kingdom for not helping Ukrainian refugees enough, specifically criticising Britain's visa policy which required applicants to apply for visas in person in Brussels or Paris before entering Britain.

On 12 March, Michael Gove announced the "Homes for Ukraine" scheme whereby Britons who offered their home to Ukrainian refugees would receive £350 a month.

On 28 March the Home Office announced it had issued 21,600 visas under the Ukraine Family Scheme, under which refugees could join close family members already resident in the UK. The government was criticised however for the slow and bureaucratic procedures in the "Homes for Ukraine" scheme previously announced by Gove. The heads of the Refugee Council, the British Red Cross, Save the Children and Oxfam made a statement warning that the system was "causing great distress to already traumatised Ukrainians". 2,500 applications for visas under this scheme had been approved by 30 March. In April 2022, The Times revealed that female refugees may be at risk of being exploited by UK men offering to be their hosts, with some proposing sexual relationship or even marriage. On 13 April, UNHCR asked the United Kingdom to stop pairing single British men with lone Ukrainian women refugees under the "Homes for Ukraine" scheme because the women were at risk of sexual exploitation.

By 8 April, a total of 12,000 Ukrainian refugees had entered Britain. 1,200 of them under the "Homes for Ukraine" scheme for those who are sponsored by UK hosts and 10,800 under the Ukrainian family scheme for those with prior family connections to the UK. The British government had received 79,800 applications for visas from Ukrainians and had issued 40,900 up to 7 April, but only 21,600 refugees had actually entered the UK by 22 April and 27,100 by 22 April under both schemes.
By 29 May this figure had reached 65,700.

Other countries

Argentina 
In May 2022, the first private plane carrying refugees arriving under humanitarian visas arrived in Buenos Aires carrying 9 passengers. The Argentine government has stated its intent to continue such flights.

Australia 
In the wake of the Russian invasion in February, Prime Minister Scott Morrison said that visa applications from Ukrainian nationals would be sent "to the top of the pile". Several Australians have opened their homes to host Ukrainian refugees, with more than 4,000 visas having been processed. On 20 March, the federal government announced that Ukrainians who arrive or are already in the country will be allowed temporary humanitarian visas, which allows them to work, study, and access healthcare. By 20 March, about 5,000 Ukrainians have been granted visas to travel to Australia, and 750 have arrived.

Brazil 
On 3 March, Brazil announced that Ukrainians would receive humanitarian visas as refugees, with a period of 5 months to apply for asylum. The country has around 600,000 people of Ukrainian descent, about 38,000 of whom live in Prudentópolis, according to the Ukrainian-Brazilian Central Representation. From 3 February until 19 March, Brazil had received almost 900 Ukrainian refugees according to Brazilian police. On 22 March, the country's police reported that 1,100 Ukrainians had landed in Brazil up to that date.

Canada 
On 3 March, the Government of Canada announced a plan to permanently reunify Canadian citizens with their Ukrainian family members. Immigration, Refugees and Citizenship Canada stated the country will allow an unlimited number of Ukrainians to apply to temporarily stay in Canada and provide work permits for Ukrainians that have either been accepted under these migration schemes or cannot safely return to Ukraine. On 17 March, the Government launched the Canada-Ukraine Authorization for Emergency Travel (CUAET), which gives Ukrainians and their families a visa to come to Canada temporarily, and allows them to work and study there for up to three years. There is no limit to the number of people who can apply, and applicants who are overseas can apply online and provide their biometrics (fingerprints and a photo). The online application takes 14 days to process.

Canada is home to nearly 1.4 million Ukrainian-Canadians, making Canada the second-largest population of the Ukrainian diaspora, after Russia. Between 17 March and 4 December, 724,494 applications through CUAET were received, of which 451,258 were approved. As applications continue to be received, the Government of Canada announced it is investing an additional CA$117 million to expedite the implementation of new immigration programs for Ukrainian refugees.

Unlike refugees from Syria or Afghanistan, refugees from Ukraine are only considered temporary residents who do not obtain permanent residency upon arrival in Canada and are only granted the right to work or study in Canada for three years.

Egypt 
When the conflict broke out, there were an estimated 16,000 to 20,000 Ukrainian tourists, now refugees, in Egypt. The Egyptian government assisted them to leave Egypt, with free flights to Poland, Slovakia, and Hungary – as of 4 March, almost 4,000 had left the country.

Israel 

As of 22 May, 36,600 Ukrainians had arrived in Israel, of whom 18,600 had the right to enter Israel.

As of 23 March, more than 15,200 Ukrainian refugees had arrived in Israel, of whom only 4,200 would have otherwise been eligible for citizenship In addition, another 20,000 Ukrainians who were already inside Israel when the conflict broke out (on tourist visas or illegally in the country) were also regarded as refugees and given permission to stay.
On July 3, 2022, the Supreme Court of Israel abolished the quotas on Ukrainian refugees in Israel and allowed unlimited entry of refugees into Israel. The President of Ukraine welcomed the decision and said it is a sign of "a true, developed democracy"

Japan 
In a rare move, Japan opened its borders to refugees from Ukraine fleeing the current war on March 15. On 12 March, it was confirmed by Chief Cabinet Secretary Hirokazu Matsuno that 29 Ukrainians had entered Japan to seek shelter with friends or relatives in Hiroshima. From the start of the Russian invasion to 6 April 2022, 437 Ukrainian refugees entered Japan. From the start of the Russian invasion to 8 June 2022, 1222 Ukrainian refugees had entered Japan. By June 8, 2022, according to the prefectures, the highest number of Ukrainian refugees were in Tokyo (215 people), Fukuoka (92 people) and Kanagawa (70 people). By June 8, 2022, 284 Ukrainian refugees were under the age of 18. From the start of the Russian invasion to 30 November 2022, 2158 Ukrainian refugees entered Japan. By November 30, 2022, according to the prefectures, the highest number of Ukrainian refugees were in Tokyo (545 people), Osaka (154 people), Kanagawa (139 people), Fukuoka (122 people) and Hyōgo (105 people). By 30 November, 2022, 417 Ukrainian refugees were under the age of 18, 1463 were between the ages of 18 and 61, and 278 were over 61.

Mexico 
Mexico has been the Latin American country that has received the most Ukrainians since February 2022.

New Zealand 
New Zealand promised to accept 4,000 Ukrainian refugees. By July 2022, 227 Ukrainians had arrived in New Zealand.

Philippines 
The Philippines' Department of Justice stated that the country would be willing to accept Ukrainian refugees and asylum seekers as a response to the Russian invasion of Ukraine. President Rodrigo Duterte on 28 February 2022 institutionalized the Philippines policy to protect refugees, stateless persons and asylum seekers under international law.

Sri Lanka 
Early in the conflict the government announced that it would grant and extend free visas by two months for over 15,000 Russians and Ukrainians who are stranded in Sri Lanka due to the ongoing conflict.

Turkey 
On 3 March, Turkey announced that 20,000 Ukrainian refugees had entered Turkey since the Russian invasion. Interior Minister Süleyman Soylu said that Turkey was glad to welcome them. By March 8, official figures put the number of Ukrainian refugees in the country at 20,550, of whom 551 were of Crimean Tatar or Meskhetian Turk origin. The Ukrainian winner of the 2016 Eurovision Song Contest, Jamala, who is of Crimean Tatar origin, also sought refuge in Turkey. By 23 March, the number of Ukrainian refugees had risen above 58,000. As of 25 April, the number of Ukrainian refugees in Turkey exceeded 85,000.

United States 
The United States announced on 4 March that Ukrainians would be provided Temporary Protected Status. This was estimated to impact 30,000 Ukrainian nationals in the United States. On 24 March, US President Biden announced that up to 100,000 Ukrainian refugees would be accepted into the United States; especially, focusing on those with family already in the country. As of June 2022, only 300 Ukrainians had been resettled under the U.S. Refugee Admissions Program, and most Ukrainian refugees came to the United States on visas they held or by crossing the U.S.-Mexico border. By late 2022 approximately 85,000 Ukrainians had utilized the "Uniting for Ukraine" program which allows refugees with an American sponsor to remain in America for two years. On 21 December 2022, President Joe Biden announced during his meeting with Volodymyr Zelenskyy that the U.S had accepted roughly 221,000 Ukrainian refugees via earlier Title 42 encounters, Uniting for Ukraine and other organisations.

International aid 
Organizations such as UNICEF, the United Nations Refugee Agency, International Rescue Committee and others began accepting monetary donations to help refugees and those affected by the crisis. Others such as The Kyiv Independent began GoFundMe campaigns to raise money for specific causes or calls for physical items to be donated.

On 10 May, the US House of Representatives passed legislation that would provide $900 million for housing, education and other help for Ukrainian refugees in the United States.

UNICEF is helping the Ukrainian children and refugees also by providing essential health services, safe drinking water supplies, education and protection.

Controversy and concerns

Human trafficking concerns

The Council of Europe's Group of Experts on Action against Trafficking in Human Beings (GRETA) and aid organizations such as the Human Trafficking Foundation and World Vision warned that refugees are at risk of falling into human trafficking, exploitation and violence, including sexual violence.

Concerns about human trafficking and sexual violence have been realized during the refugee crisis, with spotty documentation and identification, language barriers and the large numbers of refugees creating opportunities for traffickers. A Ukrainian refugee who stayed to help at a border location told reporters of calling the police on three men holding transportation signs, who were later arrested for looking for women for the sex trade. Another refugee spoke of men who attempted to coerce her and her children into a van full of only women, and refused to show her proof of identification and attempted to intimidate her from other travel options. At least one man was arrested on suspicions of raping a 19-year-old refugee after promising her work and shelter. La Strada worked on a case where Ukrainian girls were offered tickets to Mexico, Turkey and the United Arab Emirates without ever meeting the men who invited them. European Commissioner for Home Affairs Ylva Johansson said: "We have some indications on online services that the demand for Ukrainian women for sexual purposes has gone up." According to USA Today, "there has been a skyrocketing increase in all forms of illegal trafficking of women and girls in the region – and also boys – including forced sex and labor, prostitution, pornography and other forms of sexual exploitation... In recent weeks, online searches for Ukrainian women and keywords like escorts, porn or sex have shot up dramatically in European countries, according to the Organization for Security and Co-operation in Europe (OSCE)."

Polish, Romanian and Slovakian law enforcement deployed patrols to border crossings to look out for criminal activity. Both men and women have attempted to procure female refugees at stations. The Polish government passed an amendment which raised the minimum sentence of human trafficking from 3 years to 10 years, and the sex trafficking of children from 10 years to 25 years. In Berlin, German authorities advised refugees not to accept help directly from people at train stations, and for Germans to register their offers of help on coordinated websites rather than approaching refugees directly. German police also increased the number of uniformed and undercover police officers at train stations, and asked volunteers to report suspicious activity at train stations.

Unaccompanied minors
UNICEF and UNHCR raised concerns about minors who were traveling unaccompanied, and urged neighbouring countries to identify and register the children before sending them to relocation services. They also highlighted a number of institutional care and boarding schools in Ukraine which held about 10,000 students that have been caught up in the invasion. In some countries, accommodation has been created specifically for orphaned children in foster homes or orphanages. UNICEF set up "Blue Dot" safe spaces in neighboring countries, which included support for unaccompanied children. In addition, some protection for separated and unaccompanied minors is now provided through a system of temporary guardianship in the country where the children arrive, which Poland among other countries has set up under new legislation.

Deportations 

According to Ukrainian authorities, thousands of refugees arriving in Russia have been forcibly relocated using 'filtration centres', evoking the memory of Soviet era population transfers and prior Russian use of such centres in the Chechen War of Independence. Forcible deportation by a warring party is a human rights violation, and experts warn that the forcible transfer of Ukrainian children for "adoption" in Russia is a genocidal act.

RIA Novosti and Ukrainian officials stated that thousands were dispatched to filtration centres in Penza Oblast, Taganrog, Donetsk, Ryazan, Yaroslavl and the Russian-occupied Ukrainian cities of Dokuchaievsk, Izium and Bezimenne. The Ukrainian government claimed that 400,000 Ukrainian citizens have been forcibly taken to Russia where "some could be sent as far as the Pacific Ocean island of Sakhalin and are being offered jobs on condition they don't leave for two years", while "the Kremlin" claimed the relocated people wanted to go to Russia. It was reported that underground networks of Russians and Russian exiles, had been helping Ukrainian refugees to leave Russia and Russian controlled areas. More than 20,000 Ukrainians have entered Estonia from Russia since the war began.

Human Rights Watch, the UN Human Rights Office, Amnesty International, the United States Department of State, and The Intercept have reported Russian deportations of Ukrainians. According to the U.S. State Department, the number of Ukrainians who have been deported or forcibly transferred into Russia is between 900,000 and 1.6 million, citing various sources including the Russian government.

Racial discrimination

Treatment at the borders
A few days into the crisis, claims of discrimination by border guards and other authorities against non-European and Romani people were reported by some of those fleeing Ukraine. There were reports of people being forced to move to the backs of queues, deboarded from buses, prevented from crossing the border, and, in one report, being beaten by guards. Some Indians in Ukraine said they were targeted after India chose to abstain from condemning Russia at the UN. Some Indians and Africans were reportedly harassed and threatened by Polish nationalists after crossing into Poland. On 1 March, Filippo Grandi, of UNHCR, acknowledged that discrimination against non-Ukrainians had occurred at some borders, but he did not believe it was from state policies.

The African Union called attempts to prevent Africans from crossing the border racist and not in line with international law. On March 2, Ukrainian foreign minister Dmytro Kuleba stated that Africans "need to have equal opportunity" to leave the country and he also stated that "Ukraine's government spares no effort to solve the problem." On 3 March, Russian president Vladimir Putin held talks with Indian prime minister Narendra Modi and told him that he had instructed Russian soldiers to "ensure the safe exit of Indian nationals from the armed conflict zone."

In 2020, Ukraine had over 76,000 foreign students, with India and African countries each making up one quarter of the total number. With their affordable tuition, straightforward visa requirements, and the possibility of permanent residency, Ukrainian universities were seen as an entry point to the European job market. Afghans constitute the largest immigrant group in the country, having arrived as early as the 1980s. Andriy Demchenko, a spokesperson for the Ukrainian border guard, said that allegations of segregation at the borders are untrue. On 28 February, Krzysztof Szczerski, Poland's ambassador to the UN, reported that the refugees who were admitted from Ukraine on that day alone represented 125 countries. Since then, EU Commissioner Ylva Johansson has stated that its borders are open to people in Ukraine from third countries who want to travel to their home countries, and individuals in need of protection can apply for asylum.

On 2 March, the German embassy as well as the EU delegation in Kenya called for verification of the postings on Kenyan social media, cautioning that unsubstantiated claims had been spread. According to German TV station Tagesschau, such allegations are grave because they are in line with the narrative of Vladimir Putin, who has justified his attack on Ukraine with, the need to free the country from "Nazis". On Polish social media, the amount of both pro-Russian and racist content saw an increase following the invasion, and fake news about supposed crimes which were committed by, or against refugees were partially spread by pro-Kremlin accounts.

By politicians and mainstream media 
Differences between the policies, border treatment and media portrayal of Ukrainian refugees compared to other groups, in particular those during the 2015 European migrant crisis, have been criticised. Specific issues include alleged harsher treatment and more restrictions placed on Syrian, Afghan, Iraqi, and other refugees, in contrast to the relatively liberal and welcoming response to native Ukrainian refugees. Portrayal by some Western media and politicians of Ukraine as a country "where you wouldn't expect that" [war] and its people as "white", "Christian", "relatively civilized", "relatively European", "like us", and having "blue eyes and blonde hair" has also been criticised. Kenan Malik noted that there is an irony in such Western reporting, highlighting a long history of bigotry towards Slavs, of viewing them as primitive, being "a born slave", and of hostile attitudes towards Slavs by white supremacists historically.

Professor Serena Parekh suggested that besides racism there are other factors explaining the different treatment in earlier crises: including that current Ukrainian refugees are almost entirely women, children and elderly people. Under the purview of the visa liberalisation agreement in force since 2017, Ukrainians with biometric passports were already allowed to enter the Schengen zone and stay for up to 90 days within any 180 days period without a visa; therefore, there was never any question of whether they should be allowed to enter any Schengen zone country. The welcoming approach witnessed in Central and Eastern Europe has been further explained by its geographical and language proximity to Ukraine, large Ukrainian diasporas, shared history and traumatizing experiences of Soviet aggression and occupation.

Romani people have suffered since they often lack the civil status documentation needed to access humanitarian assistance. Some local officials have allegedly refused to accommodate Romani refugees from Ukraine in their territories.

Pets and zoo animals 

Domestic animals and animals in zoos were caught up in the invasion, with many border crossing regulations of microchipping and vaccinations in effect. Pets entering the EU from a third country would normally have to include an identification document or pet passport that includes information on anti-rabies vaccinations and any other preventative health measures. Additionally, dogs, cats and ferrets must undergo a rabies antibody titration test. Many EU authorities and governments of neighboring countries have since removed or relaxed the requirements needed for pets to cross the borders with their owners.

While some delayed leaving Ukraine in order to leave with their pets, others were forced to give their pets to shelters or leave them with relatives who were staying behind. Some international organizations, such as the International Fund for Animal Welfare and PETA and independent organizations or sanctuaries, have offered support in the form of food, veterinary supplies for the animals and wages along with housing for the caretakers. Others who work with animal shelters or the Kyiv Zoo have refused to evacuate, when it would be impossible to safely evacuate all the animals due to their numbers or size. The Feldman Ecopark Zoo (outside Kharkiv) reported the death and wounding of some of their animals due to damage to their facilities. A lion and a wolf were evacuated from a zoo in Zaporizhzhia, Ukraine to a zoo in Rădăuți, Romania.

See also 

 
 Demographics of Ukraine
 Emigration from Europe
 European migrant crisis
 Immigration to the Czech Republic
 Immigration to Europe
 Immigration to Germany
 Immigration to Hungary
 Immigration to Poland
 Immigration to Romania
 Immigration to Slovakia
 List of largest refugee crises
 Migration diplomacy
 Refugees in Poland
 Refugees in Romania
 Refugees of the Syrian civil war
 Russo-Ukrainian War
 
 2022 Russian invasion of Ukraine
 Russo-Ukrainian War
 Russian emigration following the 2022 invasion of Ukraine
 Venezuelan refugee crisis

Notes

References

External links 
 Information for Ukrainian refugees – published by the European Commission.

Crisis
Ukrainian diaspora
Refugees
Human rights in Ukraine
Refugees by ethnicity
Refugees by war
Refugees in Europe
Refugees in Russia
Refugees in the United States
2022 in Europe
2022 in the European Union
2022 in politics
2022 in the Czech Republic
2022 in Germany
2022 in Hungary
2022 in Moldova
2022 in Poland
2022 in Romania
2022 in Russia
2022 in Slovakia
2022 in Ukraine 
European migrant crisis
Migrant crises
Illegal immigration to Europe
Immigration to Germany
Immigration to Hungary
Immigration to Moldova
Immigration to Poland
Immigration to Romania
Immigration to Russia
Immigration to Slovakia
Czech Republic–Ukraine relations
Refugees
Refugees
Refugees
Refugees
Refugees
Refugees
Refugees
Social history of Ukraine
2022 in international relations
2022 disasters in Europe
2022 disasters in Ukraine
2023 in Ukraine 
2023 disasters in Europe
2023 disasters in Ukraine